Talha Jubair (born December 10, 1985 in Faridpur District) is a Bangladeshi cricketer. He played in 7 Tests and 6 One Day Internationals from 2002 to 2004.

Record 
Jubair set a world record for top scoring for his team as a number 11 batsman in the 3rd innings of a test match (31) and was the first ever batsman from any team to top score for his team when batting at number 11 position in the 3rd innings of a test match. He scored 31 runs, where Bangladesh were bowled out for just 124 in their second innings (which was the 3rd innings of that match) against India in 2004. Jubair was only the 6th number 11 batsman in test history to top score for his team in an innings of a test.

References

External links

1985 births
Living people
Bangladesh Test cricketers
Bangladesh One Day International cricketers
Bangladeshi cricketers
Cricketers at the 2003 Cricket World Cup
Dhaka Division cricketers
Sylhet Strikers cricketers
Bangladesh Central Zone cricketers
Barisal Division cricketers
People from Faridpur District